Cecil Smith may refer to:
Cecil Smith (figure skater) (1908–1997), Canadian figure skater
Cecil Clementi Smith (1840–1916), British colonial administrator
Cecil Smith (politician) (1927–1988), Manitoba member of Canadian Parliament
Cecil Smith (footballer, born 1904) (1904–1977), Welsh footballer
Cecil Smith (footballer, born 1907) (1907–1990), English footballer
Cecil Smith (polo) (1904–1999), American polo player
Cecil Harcourt Smith (1859–1944), British archaeologist and museum director
Cecil Smith (Auditor General), Auditor General of Sri Lanka
Cecil Smith (track and field) (1936-2016), athletics coach and builder, publisher
R. Cecil Smith, American screenwriter

See also
Cecil Woodham-Smith (1896–1977), British historian and biographer
Cecil Humphery-Smith (born 1928), British genealogist and heraldist